William Case (1818–1862) was an American politician.

William Case may also refer to:

 William Case (cricketer) (1873–1922), English cricketer
 W. R. Case & Sons Cutlery Co., an American manufacturer
 William Case, a character in Blackhawk (serial)
 William Case, of the 1784 Dutch corvette Scipio

See also
 William Casey (disambiguation)